The USA Softball Collegiate Player of the Year is an award given by USA Softball to the best college softball player of the year. The award has been given annually since 2002. The award is voted on by coaching representatives of 10 Division I conferences in the 10 USA Softball regions, members of the media who consistently cover Division I softball across the country, as well as past winners of the award.

Winners

References

Awards established in 2002
College softball player of the year awards in the United States